Rapmasters: From Tha Priority Vaults, Vol. 6 is the sixth volume of an eight volume budget compilation series that Priority Records released throughout 1996 and 1997. As is the standard with almost all volumes in the series, This was only released in an edited version that censored many of the profanities that originally appeared in these songs.

Track listing
 It Was a Good Day (Ice Cube)
 Peep Game (JT The Bigga Figga Featuring D-Moe)
 Calm Before Da Storm (O.G.C.)
 The Evil That Men Do (Ras Kass)
 Red Carpet (Me & My Cousin)
 On Them Thangs (Mack 10)
 Radio (Eazy-E)
 Dead Men Can't Rap (Lil 1/2 Dead)
 Gamers (The Conscious Daughters)

References

1997 compilation albums
Priority Records compilation albums
Gangsta rap compilation albums
Hip hop compilation albums
Record label compilation albums